A total solar eclipse will occur on May 20, 2050. A solar eclipse occurs when the Moon passes between Earth and the Sun, thereby totally or partly obscuring the image of the Sun for a viewer on Earth. A total solar eclipse occurs when the Moon's apparent diameter is larger than the Sun's, blocking all direct sunlight, turning day into darkness. Totality occurs in a narrow path across Earth's surface, with the partial solar eclipse visible over a surrounding region thousands of kilometres wide. This eclipse is a hybrid eclipse, starting and ending as an annular solar eclipse.

Related eclipses

Solar eclipses 2047–2050

Saros 148

Inex series 

In the 19th century:
 Solar saros 140: total solar eclipse of October 29, 1818
 Solar saros 141: annular solar eclipse of October 9, 1847
 Solar saros 142: total solar eclipse of September 17, 1876

In the 22nd century:
 Solar saros 150: partial solar eclipse of April 11, 2108
 Solar saros 151: annular solar eclipse of March 21, 2137
 Solar saros 152: total solar eclipse of March 2, 2166
 Solar saros 153: annular solar eclipse of February 10, 2195

Metonic series

Notes

References

2050 5 20
2050 in science
2050 5 20
2050 5 20